Baveh (also Romanized as Bāveh) is a village in Baryaji Rural District, in the Central District of Sardasht County, West Azerbaijan Province, Iran. At the 2006 census, its population was 172, in 35 families.

References 

Populated places in Sardasht County